Cynanchum guehoi, the Rodrigues cynanchum, is a rare plant from the subfamily Asclepiadoideae within in the family Apocynaceae. It is endemic to the island of Rodrigues in the Indian Ocean.

Description

Cynanchum guehoi is a leafless vine with cylindrical, twining, fleshy, glabrous stems and a toxic white sap. When not in flower it is extremely easy to confuse with the common Cynanchum viminale which is widespread across Africa and southern Asia and also naturally occurs in Rodrigues.

The fragrant flowers smell faintly of Jasmine. They are born in bunches, at the branch internodes. Each flower has five outer lobes, which open out and look like the petals of a flower. However the Rodrigues cynanchum's inner lobes are formed into a single corona in the centre, about 1.5 mm high. The tip of each inner lobe is triangular, with a thick, slightly curved lip.

The related Cynanchum viminale also has five outer lobes resembling petals. However the corona is skirted at its base by a thin ring (the outer coronal ring). Its inner coronal lobes are smooth, oval and curved inwards like tusks.

References

guehoi
Endemic flora of Rodrigues